Mike Inglis (born 30 October 1966) is a Canadian gymnast. He competed in seven events at the 1992 Summer Olympics.

References

External links
 

1966 births
Living people
Canadian male artistic gymnasts
Olympic gymnasts of Canada
Gymnasts at the 1992 Summer Olympics
People from Cobourg
Sportspeople from Ontario